HandBrake is a free and open-source transcoder for digital video files. It was originally developed in 2003 by Eric Petit to make ripping DVDs to a data storage device easier. HandBrake's backend contains comparatively little original code; the program is an integration of many third-party audio and video libraries, both codecs (such as FFmpeg, x264, and x265) and other components such as video deinterlacers (referred to as "filters"). These are collected in such a manner to make their use more effective and accessible (e.g., so that a user does not have to transcode a video's audio and visual components in separate steps, or with inaccessible command-line utilities).

HandBrake clients are available for Linux, macOS, and Windows.

History

Early versions
HandBrake was originally developed by Eric Petit in 2003 as software for BeOS, before porting it to other systems. He continued to be the primary developer until April 2006, when the last official Subversion revision was committed. Petit continued to be active on the HandBrake forum for a brief period after. From May–June 2006, no one in the HandBrake community was successful in contacting Petit, and no further code changes were officially made.

MediaFork
In September 2006, Rodney Hester and Chris Long had been independently working to extract the H.264 video compression format from Apple's iPod firmware (1.2) through reverse engineering before meeting on the HandBrake forum.  Since their work was complementary, they began working together to develop an unstable, but still compilable, release of HandBrake supporting the H.264 format. Hester and Long made progress in terms of stability, functionality, and look and feel, but it was not possible to submit their patch to the HandBrake subversion repository without authorisation from Petit.

Unable to submit their revisions as a successor to HandBrake, Hester created a subversion repository mirroring HandBrake's final subversion (0.7.1) on the HandBrake website and began development on top of that. Hester and Long named the new project MediaFork.

From 2007
On 13 February 2007, Hester and Long were contacted by Petit who informed them of his support and encouraged them to continue development. Plans were then made to reintegrate MediaFork as a direct successor to HandBrake. The MediaFork website and forums were moved to HandBrake's, and the next release was officially named HandBrake. On 24 December 2016 after more than 13 years of development, HandBrake 1.0.0 was released.

There is another transcoder, called VidCoder, that uses HandBrake as its encoding engine.

Features

Hardware acceleration 
Some GPUs (including GPUs physically integrated with CPUs, referred to by AMD as APUs) contain dedicated hardware for video encoding and decoding (Intel's Quick Sync Video, Nvidia's NVENC, or AMD's Video Coding Engine / Video Core Next). This hardware is usually provided for scenarios where quick and power-efficient compressed video is desired, such as videoconferencing and streaming video. It is less often used for transcoding like that performed by HandBrake because its compression efficiency can rarely match an optimized software encoder for the same codec, but HandBrake still provides the owners of compatible hardware (who are willing to accept the tradeoff) with the option of hardware encoding. Quick Sync was added in November 2014 with version 0.10.0, while NVENC and the VCE became supported in version 1.2.0, released December 2018. (HandBrake supports both the VCE and the newer VCN, but its interface only mentions the VCE by name, even if VCN hardware is present or a codec is being used that is too new to have VCE support.)

Transcoding
Users can customize the output by altering the bit rate, maximum file size or bit rate and sample rate via "constant quality". HandBrake supports adaptive deinterlacing, scaling, detelecine, and cropping, both automatic and manual.

Batch
HandBrake supports batch encoding through graphical user interface (GUI) and command-line interface (CLI). Third-party scripts and UIs exist specifically for this purpose, such as HandBrake Batch Encoder, VideoScripts, and Batch HandBrake. All make use of the CLI to enable queueing of several files in a single directory.

Sources
Handbrake transcodes video and audio from nearly any format to a handful of modern ones, but it does not defeat or circumvent copy protection. One form of input is DVD-Video stored on a DVD, in an ISO image of a DVD, or on any data storage device as a VIDEO_TS folder. HandBrake's developers removed libdvdcss (the open-source library responsible for unscrambling DVDs encrypted with the Content Scramble System (CSS)) from the application in version 0.9.2. Removal of digital rights management (DRM) from DVDs using HandBrake was possible by installing VLC, a media player application that includes the libdvdcss library. Handbrake can remove DRM only if the user installs libdvdcss.

As with DVDs, HandBrake does not directly support the decryption of Blu-ray Discs. However, HandBrake can be used to transcode a Blu-ray Disc if DRM is first removed using a third-party application.

Support

Input

 DVD-Video (from disc or ISO image)
 Matroska (MKV)
 Audio Video Interleave (AVI)
 MPEG-4 Part 14 (MP4)
 MPEG Transport Stream (TS)
 BDAV MPEG-2 Transport Stream (M2TS)

Output

Container formats
 MPEG-4 Part 14 (MP4)
 iTunes Video (M4V)
 Matroska (MKV)
 AVI (up to version 0.9.3)

Video formats
 H.264 using x264, Nvidia NVENC, Intel QSV and AMD VCE
 H.265/HEVC using x265, Nvidia NVENC, Intel QSV and AMD VCE
 MPEG-4 ASP using libav
 MPEG-2 using libav
 Theora using libtheora
 VP8 and VP9 using libvpx

Audio formats
 Advanced Audio Coding (AAC) using libav for Windows and Linux or using CoreAudio in macOS
 HE-AAC (till version 0.10.3 for Windows and Linux), using CoreAudio on macOS
 AC-3
 FLAC 16-bit and 24-bit
 MPEG-1 or MPEG-2 Audio Layer III (MP3)
 Opus
 Vorbis
 Pass-through for AAC, AC-3, DTS, DTS-HD, E-AC-3, FLAC, MP3, and TrueHD

Reception
In 2011, Preston Gralla of PC World praised HandBrake for its feature set: "Advanced users will be pleased at the number of options." However, he criticized the usability for new users: "Note that HandBrake isn't necessarily the easiest program to use. It has a large number of options available, and there's no good explanation of what they do or how to use them. Beginners should stick with the defaults". He concluded by calling HandBrake a "solid choice" for people who are looking for a free video transcoder.

In 2013, Lifehacker.com visitors voted HandBrake as the most popular video converter over four other candidates by a wide margin.

See also

 Comparison of video converters
 List of OpenCL applications

References

External links

 

Cross-platform free software
DVD rippers
Free software programmed in C
Free software programmed in C Sharp
Free software programmed in Objective-C
Free software projects
Free video conversion software
MacOS multimedia software
Software that uses FFmpeg
Software that uses GStreamer
Software that uses GTK
Video software that uses GTK
Windows multimedia software
2003 software